

267001–267100 

|-id=003
| 267003 Burkert ||  || Andreas M. Burkert (born 1959), president of the German Astronomische Gesellschaft and professor in computational astrophysics at the University of Munich || 
|-id=017
| 267017 Yangzhifa || 1995 UA || Yang Zhifa (born 1933) was a Chinese farmer and one of the discoverers of the first terracotta statues that constitute part of the Mausoleum of the First Qin Emperor, Qin Shi Huang. || 
|}

267101–267200 

|-bgcolor=#f2f2f2
| colspan=4 align=center | 
|}

267201–267300 

|-bgcolor=#f2f2f2
| colspan=4 align=center | 
|}

267301–267400 

|-bgcolor=#f2f2f2
| colspan=4 align=center | 
|}

267401–267500 

|-bgcolor=#f2f2f2
| colspan=4 align=center | 
|}

267501–267600 

|-id=585
| 267585 Popluhár ||  || Ján Popluhár (1935–2011), a Slovak football player || 
|}

267601–267700 

|-bgcolor=#f2f2f2
| colspan=4 align=center | 
|}

267701–267800 

|-bgcolor=#f2f2f2
| colspan=4 align=center | 
|}

267801–267900 

|-bgcolor=#f2f2f2
| colspan=4 align=center | 
|}

267901–268000 

|-bgcolor=#f2f2f2
| colspan=4 align=center | 
|}

References 

267001-268000